Tower Square may refer to:

 Tower Square (Atlanta)
 Tower Square (Springfield, Massachusetts)

Others
 Clock Tower Square, in Thimphu, Bhutan
 Martyrs' Square, Beirut, formerly Sahat al-Burj (Tower Square)
 Travelers Tower, formerly One Tower Square